"Don't Throw Your Love Away" is a song written by Billy Jackson and Jimmy Wisner that was originally released in 1963 by The Orlons.  It was the B-side to "Bon-Doo-Wah", which peaked at #55 in the US charts.

Cover Versions
The Searchers released it in April 1964 and went to #1 on the UK Singles Chart and the Irish Singles Chart; #4 in Denmark, #6 on 24 July 1964 on WLS, and #16 on 11 July 1964 on the Hot 100.
Elvis Costello and Amsterdam recorded a version of the song for Liverpool – The Number Ones Album released in 2008.

See also
List of number-one singles of 1964 (Ireland)
List of number-one singles from the 1960s (UK)

References

1964 singles
The Searchers (band) songs
Irish Singles Chart number-one singles
UK Singles Chart number-one singles
Pye Records singles
1963 songs